The Tamil Nadu Legislature is the unicameral legislature of the Indian state of Tamil Nadu. The Legislature is composed of Tamil Nadu Legislative Assembly and the Governor of Tamil Nadu

Until 1 November 1986, the Tamil Nadu Legislature was a bicameral legislature consisting of:
 the Tamil Nadu Legislative Council, the upper house,
 the Tamil Nadu Legislative Assembly, the lower house, and
 the Governor of Tamil Nadu

In 2010, the erstwhile Dravida Munnetra Kazhagam (DMK) Government took steps to revive the Tamil Nadu Legislative Council and convert the legislature back into a bicameral one, but the administration left power during this time and was unable to continue. The All India Anna Dravida Munnetra Kazhagam (AIADMK) Government which assumed power in 2011, expressed its intent not to revive the Tamil Nadu Legislative Council.

See also
Elections in Tamil Nadu
Government of Tamil Nadu

References

External links
Official website

 
Unicameral legislatures
Legislature
State legislatures of India